Baeolidia scottjohnsoni, is a species of sea slug, an aeolid nudibranch. It is a marine gastropod mollusc in the family Aeolidiidae found in the Marshall Islands and Hawaii, United States.

Distribution
A second specimen from Hawaii was included in the description.

Description
The body of Baeolidia scottjohnsoni is brown with a dense pattern of opaque white pigment over much of the dorsal surface. The rhinophores are stout with long papillae on the surfaces. The cerata are slightly flattened and coloured brown on the exterior faces but have conspicuous blue and white curved bands on the surfaces facing inwards over the back.

References

Aeolidiidae
Gastropods described in 2014